Oxydrepanus is a genus of beetles in the family Carabidae, containing the following species:

 Oxydrepanus amrishi Makhan, 2010
 Oxydrepanus brasiliensis Putzeys, 1866
 Oxydrepanus bulirschi Dostal & L. M. Vieira, 2018
 Oxydrepanus coamensis (Mutchler, 1934)
 Oxydrepanus cristalensis Zayas, 1988
 Oxydrepanus cubanus Zayas, 1988
 Oxydrepanus luridus Putzeys, 1866
 Oxydrepanus mexicanus Putzeys, 1866
 Oxydrepanus micans Putzeys, 1866
 Oxydrepanus minae Makhan & Ezzatpanah, 2011
 Oxydrepanus minimus Putzeys, 1866
 Oxydrepanus minor (Kult, 1950)
 Oxydrepanus ovalis Putzeys, 1866
 Oxydrepanus ovoideus (Kult, 1950)
 Oxydrepanus reicheoides Darlington, 1939
 Oxydrepanus rishwani Makhan, 2010
 Oxydrepanus rufus (Putzeys, 1846)
 Oxydrepanus valdesi Dostal & L. M. Vieira, 2018

References

Scaritinae